"Homesick" is an episode of the BBC sitcom, Only Fools and Horses. It was the first episode of series 3, and was first broadcast on 10 November 1983. In the episode Rodney is appointed chairman of the local Tenants Association, and Del expects him to use his influence to secure a move to a council bungalow.

Synopsis
As Del Boy prepares himself to go out with a waitress from a pizzeria, Rodney plans to go to the local Tenants Association meeting to report things needing sorting, such as the lifts in Nelson Mandela House, which have broken down.

Rodney arrives at the meeting to find that the only other person attending is Trigger. While waiting for the meeting to start, Rodney finally asks Trigger why he keeps calling him Dave. Trigger explains that he thought it was his name, but Rodney assures his name is not, nor has it ever been, Dave. Trigger states he will have to start calling him Rodney, only to start using Dave again straight away. Baz, the chairman, mentions that the meeting cannot start without the vice-chairman present, which could be a while since he died the previous fortnight, and that he wanted to use the meeting to elect a new vice-chairman. Trigger votes Rodney to fill the position. The meeting starts with Baz tendering his resignation and promoting Rodney to the position of chairman in an instant. Rodney is shocked, and Baz and Trigger leave to get a drink. Sat up on the stage, Rodney begins to realise the power he has with the position.

Later, at the market, as Del sells oranges, Rodney appears and tells him all about the meeting as well as Margaret Mackenzie, one of the well-known higher-ups of the Tenants Association. Grandad also shows up, even though his legs are hurting. Rodney offers Grandad a lift home, but he plans to walk off the pain.

The Trotter brothers return home to find Grandad collapsed on the floor and phone for Dr. Becker. Dr. Becker diagnoses that Grandad, now confined to his bed, is suffering from exhaustion due to climbing twelve flights of stairs. Because of this, Dr. Becker recommends that the Trotters be moved into a council bungalow on Herrington Road. As Becker prepares to write to the chairman of the Tenants Association, Rodney exits the kitchen and admits that he is the chairman.

Rodney is initially reluctant to exercise his influence in fear of appearing to exploit his position so soon for self-interest. That night, Grandad gives Rodney a dented silver cigarette case and tells him and Del that it was carried by his (Grandad's) grandfather in the Boer War, and explains he carried it in his breast pocket, which prevented him from being shot in the heart by a rifle-wielding Zulu. Unfortunately it did not save his life, instead causing the bullet to ricochet up his nose and blow his brains out. Following a brief conversation, an emotional Rodney decides to phone the council and arrange the move.

The next day, Rodney introduces Margaret Mackenzie to Del, and they talk about the world of dancing and Nijinsky. Despite Del being a fool and failing to realise that Nijinsky died in 1950 (after claiming he was planning on buying tickets for one of his shows, and also thinking Nijinsky was a woman), Miss Mackenzie agrees to let them have a new bungalow. Once Miss Mackenzie signs the document, all is set for the Trotters. They can move into their new bungalow in a week's time, and she even agrees to go out for a drink with Del after they have moved.

As Miss Mackenzie leaves the flat, Grandad enters the lounge, now back on his feet and dancing. Rodney learns that it was all planned by Del and Grandad all along to secure the move. Though initially angry that Del duped Miss Mackenzie and Dr. Becker (as well as sabotaging the lifts to make them break down), Rodney relents when Grandad mentions that he will have no stairs to worry about, with Rodney agreeing for Grandad's sake that they needed a new home.

Suddenly, Miss Mackenzie returns to ask Del if he wants to go for the drink there and then, only to find Grandad fit and active again. Infuriated, she forces Rodney to resign as chairman and then tells the Trotters that they will no longer be moving into their bungalow. Despite all that has happened, Del still asks her if the offer of a drink is still open.

Episode cast

Notes

Gilly Flower and Renee Roberts, who played Miss Tibbs and Miss Gatsby respectively in Fawlty Towers, both appeared as one-shot characters in this episode. While the BBC's own publication Radio Times billed them as their Fawlty Towers characters, no reference was made to this in this episode.

References

External links

1983 British television episodes
Only Fools and Horses (series 3) episodes
Crossover television